Filippos Kasidokostas (born 14 November 1983) is a Greek professional three-cushion billiards player.

References

External links
Filippos Kasidokostas official website

Living people
1983 births
World champions in three-cushion billiards